Vladimir Yakovlev (14 March 1930 – 29 September 2009) was a Soviet sailor. He competed in the Dragon event at the 1972 Summer Olympics.

References

External links
 

1930 births
2009 deaths
Soviet male sailors (sport)
Olympic sailors of the Soviet Union
Sailors at the 1972 Summer Olympics – Dragon
Sportspeople from Saint Petersburg